The Phorcides  or Phorcydes ("the daughters of Phorcys") may refer to:

 The Phorcides, another name for the Graeae in Greek mythology, because they were daughters of Phorcys
 The Phorcides, another name for the Gorgons in Greek mythology, because they were daughters of Phorcys
 The Phorcides, a lost play  about the Graeae by the 5th century BC Greek playwright